The Amiri Hospital is a general hospital located in the Kuwait City and it serves an estimated 400,000 patients per year.

History
The hospital was built in 1949 to be the first government owned hospital. Before that there was only the US missionary hospital and small clinics run by doctors in their own houses. The original hospital building was closed in the 1970s after the opening of the new modern building.

Building
The current main building of Amiri Hospital is located on the Arabian Gulf Street, overlooking the Persian Gulf. It comprises ten floors and a basement.

Official website
Amiri Hospital

Hospital buildings completed in 1949
Hospitals in Kuwait
Hospitals established in 1949
1949 establishments in Kuwait